Karpaty may refer to:
 the Carpathian Mountains
 FC Karpaty Lviv, Ukrainian Association football team
 FC Karpaty Halych, Ukrainian Association football team
 Settled places:
 Karpaty, Zakarpattia Oblast, in Zakarpattia Oblast of Ukraine
 Karpaty, Kuyavian-Pomeranian Voivodeship, Poland

See also
 Karpathos